Nikolay Yanakiev Dimirov (born 6 June 1985 in Gorno Draglishte) is a Bulgarian footballer who plays as a midfielder for Pirin Razlog.

References

1985 births
Living people
First Professional Football League (Bulgaria) players
OFC Pirin Blagoevgrad players
PFC Pirin Gotse Delchev players
FC Pirin Razlog players
Association football midfielders
Bulgarian footballers